Virginia Willis is a Southern American cookbook author, chef, and on-air personality. She has appeared on Food Network Kitchen.

Early life 
Virginia was born in Augusta, Georgia, and moved to Alexandria, Louisiana, where she attended elementary school and grew up eating Cajun and Creole cuisine. Her family relocated back to Georgia when she was in middle school.  

After beginning college at age 16, Willis earned a B.A. from the University of Georgia. She began her studies in culinary arts at L'Academie de Cuisine in Maryland and graduated in 1994. She continued her education abroad at Ecole de Cuisine LaVarenne in Burgundy, France, and graduated with a Grande Diplome in 1995.

Career 
Willis’ first job in a professional kitchen was as an apprentice to Southern food authority Nathalie Dupree. Since working as Test kitchen director on Dupree's PBS cooking series. Willis worked as editorial assistant to French cooking authority Anne Willan. Willis worked as Kitchen Director for celebrity television hosts Martha Stewart and Bobby Flay.  She began her production career, producing and directing such shows as Epicurious (The Discovery Channel) and Home Plate (Turner Studios). She currently produces culinary video through Culinary Media Training and Productions, co-founded with a colleague Cynthia Graubart.

Writing 
Willis has appeared in Eating Well magazine, and Allrecipe magazine as a success story with her weight loss. 

She has also appeared in the New York Times, Country Living, House Beautiful, Food52, and The Washington Post.

Television 
She has appeared on Food Network Kitchen, CBS This Morning, Fox and Friends, Martha Stewart Living Television, Paula Deen's Best Dishes, and Throwdown! with Bobby Flay. Willis placed second on an episode of Food Network's Chopped (“Bird in the Pan”) that aired on November 27, 2012.

Awards
 2018: “25 Books all Georgians Should Read” for Secrets of the Southern Table; Georgia Center for the Book
 2016: James Beard Foundation Award of Excellence 
 2016: Finalist International Association of Culinary Professionals Best American Cookbook
 2009: “25 Books all Georgians Should Read” for Bon Appétit, Y’all; Georgia Center for the Book 
 2008: Finalist for the International Association of Culinary Professionals Best American Cookbook Bon Appétit, Y’all

Bibliography
Secrets of the Southern Table (Houghton Mifflin Harcourt 2018)
Lighten Up, Y'all (Ten Speed Press, March 2015) 
Okra: A Savor the South Cookbook (The University of North Carolina Press, 2014)
Volume 5: Grits (Short Stack Editions, 2013)
Basic to Brilliant, Y'all (Ten Speed Press, 2011)
Bon Appétit, Y'all (Ten Speed Press, 2008)

References

Living people
People from Augusta, Georgia
American food writers
American women non-fiction writers
Year of birth missing (living people)
21st-century American women
American chefs
American cookbook writers
Women cookbook writers